The NBA G League, or simply the G League, is the National Basketball Association's (NBA) official minor league basketball organization. The league was known as the National Basketball Development League (NBDL) from 2001 to 2005, and the NBA Development League (NBA D-League) from 2005 until 2017. The league started with eight teams until NBA commissioner David Stern announced a plan to expand the NBA D-League to 15 teams and develop it into a true minor league farm system, with each NBA D-League team affiliated with one or more NBA teams in March 2005. At the conclusion of the 2013–14 NBA season, 33% of NBA players had spent time in the NBA D-League, up from 23% in 2011. As of the 2020–21 season, the league consists of 30 teams, 28 of which are either single-affiliated or owned by an NBA team, along with the NBA G League Ignite exhibition team.

In the 2017–18 season, Gatorade became the title sponsor of the D-League, and it was renamed the NBA G League.

History

National Basketball Development League (2001–2005)
The league began its play as the National Basketball Development League (NBDL) in the 2001–02 season; the original eight franchises were all located in the southeastern United States (specifically in Virginia, North Carolina, South Carolina, Alabama, and Georgia).

NBA Development League (2005–2017)
In 2005, the league's name was changed to NBA Development League (NBA D-League) as part of the new collective bargaining agreement with the NBA and a bid to appeal to more fans by showing their connection to the major league. In the same offseason, Southwest Basketball, LLC led by David Kahn was granted permission by the league to operate four new teams. Southwest Basketball then purchased three existing franchises and one expansion team: the Albuquerque Thunderbirds, Austin Toros, Fort Worth Flyers and the Tulsa 66ers. The Arkansas RimRockers were also added from the ABA for the 2005–06 season. In February 2006, the D-League expanded to California for the first time with the addition of the Bakersfield Jam. Two months later, the league announced that four teams from the Continental Basketball Association were joining the league: the Dakota Wizards, Sioux Falls Skyforce, Idaho Stampede, and a team originally slated for CBA expansion, the Colorado 14ers. Shortly after, the league announced expansion teams in the Anaheim Arsenal and the Los Angeles D-Fenders. The D-Fenders became the first D-League team to be directly owned by an NBA parent team, the Los Angeles Lakers.

However, the westward expansion contributed to the contraction of the NBA-owned Roanoke Dazzle and Fayetteville Patriots for that season. The Florida Flame suspended operations due to arena scheduling difficulties. After the 2006–07 season, there would be no more teams in the southeastern United States until the 2016 expansion team, the Greensboro Swarm.

After the 2006 to 2009 expansions, the league membership was fairly consistent with only a few relocations and suspensions. In 2009, the Houston Rockets entered into the first single-affiliation partnership, called the hybrid model, with the Rio Grande Valley Vipers. This began a wave of NBA and D-League teams entering into single-affiliation agreements of both the hybrid and parent-team owned varieties. With more NBA involvement, the league once again began to expand and spread its footprint.

By 2015, the last multiple-affiliate team, the Fort Wayne Mad Ants, was purchased by the Indiana Pacers leading to the first season where all D-League teams were affiliated with only one NBA team. As there were no longer any unaffiliated D-League teams left, the remaining NBA teams began purchasing expansion franchises or hybrid partnership teams and placing them near the parent team. In 2015, the Toronto Raptors placed their own team, Raptors 905, in the Greater Toronto Area in Mississauga, Ontario. In 2016, the D-League expanded by three more NBA parent club-owned teams for the largest D-League expansion since 2007. The Charlotte Hornets created the Greensboro Swarm, the Brooklyn Nets created the Long Island Nets, and the Chicago Bulls created the Windy City Bulls.

NBA G League (2017–present)

In the 2017–18 season, the D-League entered into a multi-year partnership with Gatorade and announced it would be rebranded as the NBA Gatorade League, which was officially shortened to "NBA G League" prior to the season. It also continued its membership changes with the relocation of the Erie BayHawks to Lakeland, Florida, as the Lakeland Magic, a new Erie BayHawks franchise; and expansions in the Agua Caliente Clippers in Ontario, California (now known as the Ontario Clippers); the Memphis Hustle in Southaven, Mississippi; and the Wisconsin Herd in Oshkosh, Wisconsin. The Los Angeles D-Fenders would also re-brand to the South Bay Lakers.

In December 2017, the NBA and the live streaming website Twitch announced that they would broadcast G League games on Twitch. Games have also been aired on the ESPN Plus subscription service.

For the 2019–20 season, the G League will begin to offer select contracts to players that are not yet eligible to enter the NBA Draft. Since 2006, players that are not at least nineteen years old by the end of the calendar year have been ineligible, creating what became known as the "one-and-done" rule where players joined a college basketball team for one season and would then leave for the NBA. The new select contract is to be an alternative for players who do not want to or cannot attend a college, worth up to $125,000 for a season. The league launched its prospects team, the NBA G League Ignite, in 2020.

Following the COVID-19 pandemic-curtailed 2019–20 season, the G League postponed the start of the following season. In January 2021, the league announced it would play all games at Walt Disney World in Orlando, Florida, using the same isolation bubble as the 2020 NBA Bubble. Many teams opted out of participation, with 17 of the 28 teams from the 2019–20 season plus the new Ignite prospects team choosing to take part in the abbreviated bubble season beginning in February 2021.

Teams

Current teams

Team ownership and NBA affiliations
Ownership models vary across the NBA G League. Growing willingness among NBA organizations to invest in the G League has led to two main models: direct ownership of G League teams by parent NBA clubs and single-affiliate partnerships in which the G League team remains independently owned while the parent club runs and finances basketball operations.

Parent club direct ownership began in 2006 when the Los Angeles Lakers bought their own NBA D-League franchise, originally known as the Los Angeles D-Fenders and since 2017–18 as the South Bay Lakers. This was followed by the San Antonio Spurs purchasing the Austin Toros (now the Austin Spurs) in 2007, and the Oklahoma City Thunder purchasing the Tulsa 66ers (now the Oklahoma City Blue) in 2008. This led to more NBA teams to either purchase existing franchises or create expansion teams in order to have their own single-affiliation teams. In 2011, the Cleveland Cavaliers purchased the New Mexico Thunderbirds to become the Canton Charge and the Golden State Warriors purchased the Dakota Wizards, with the Warriors moving the Wizards a year later to become the Santa Cruz Warriors. In 2013, the Philadelphia 76ers purchased the inactive Utah Flash and moved them to Newark, Delaware as the Delaware 87ers (now the Delaware Blue Coats, and playing in that state's largest city of Wilmington). In 2014, the New York Knicks became the seventh team to fully own and operate their own NBA D-League affiliate in the Westchester Knicks. In 2015, the Toronto Raptors created their own expansion franchise, the Raptors 905. In 2017, the Timberwolves purchased the Iowa Energy and renamed the team the Iowa Wolves.

In 2009, the Houston Rockets and Rio Grande Valley Vipers pioneered the single-affiliate partnership, also known as the hybrid model. In November 2010, the New Jersey Nets and Springfield Armor announced they would enter into a single-affiliate partnership that began in 2011–12. In June 2011, the New York Knicks and Erie BayHawks announced they would be singly-affiliated. In May 2012, the Portland Trail Blazers entered into a single-affiliation partnership with the Idaho Stampede. The following month, the Boston Celtics and Maine Red Claws announced a single-affiliation partnership. In June 2013, the Miami Heat announced that they had entered into a single-affiliated partnership with the Sioux Falls Skyforce. In July 2013, the Sacramento Kings and Reno Bighorns (now the Stockton Kings) entered into a single-affiliation. The Stampede ended their affiliation with the Trail Blazers after the 2013–14 season and in June 2014 announced their affiliation with the Utah Jazz. The Armor moved to Grand Rapids, Michigan, after the 2013–14 season and affiliated with the Detroit Pistons. From 2014 to 2017, the Memphis Grizzlies had a single-affiliation with the Iowa Energy. In 2015, the last multiple affiliate team, the Fort Wayne Mad Ants, was purchased by the Indiana Pacers making the 2015–16 season the first with all teams having single-affiliations.

In some cases, the hybrid affiliation led to the parent team buying their affiliate's franchise outright. On March 24, 2015, the Utah Jazz purchased their affiliate, the Idaho Stampede, and after one more season in Boise relocated the team to Salt Lake City. On April 11, 2016, the Phoenix Suns purchased their affiliate, the Bakersfield Jam, and announced the immediate relocation of the team to Prescott Valley, Arizona, as the Northern Arizona Suns beginning with the 2016–17 season. On October 20, 2016, the Sacramento Kings bought the majority ownership of their affiliate of the previous eight seasons, the Reno Bighorns, and would eventually move the team to Stockton, California as the Stockton Kings after the 2017–18 season. On December 14, 2016, the Magic purchased their affiliate, the Erie BayHawks, with the intention to relocate the team to Lakeland, Florida, in 2017. In 2017, the Miami Heat purchased the controlling interest in the Sioux Falls Skyforce after being its primary affiliate since 2013. On February 21, 2019, the Atlanta Hawks relocated the second incarnation of the Erie BayHawks to College Park, Georgia, becoming the College Park Skyhawks. In July 2019, the Boston Celtics acquired its affiliate, the Maine Red Claws, then became the Maine Celtics in 2021. In 2021, the Detroit Pistons relocated the Northern Arizona Suns to Detroit and renamed the team as the Motor City Cruise. The Grand Rapids Drive, previously affiliated by the Pistons, then agreed to a new affiliation with the Denver Nuggets, renaming the team to the Grand Rapids Gold. On April 8, 2021, the third and final incarnation of the Erie BayHawks, affiliated by the New Orleans Pelicans, was relocated to Birmingham, Alabama and became the Birmingham Squadron.

Some teams may also not have an affiliation at all. On December 12, 2019, NBA commissioner Adam Silver announced that current Liga Nacional de Baloncesto Profesional team, Capitanes de Ciudad de México would be joining the NBA G League in the 2020–21 season on a five-year agreement, making it the NBA's first team based in Mexico. Due to the restrictions of the COVID-19 pandemic, a normal 2020–21 season did not occur and the Capitanes' debut was then delayed to the 2021–22 season. On April 16, 2020, the NBA launched a new development program for elite, up-and-coming prospects to prepare them for the NBA. Part of the new program is a new team called the NBA G League Ignite, which began play in the 2020-21 season.

Parent club ownership: 
Austin Spurs (by the San Antonio Spurs) 
Birmingham Squadron (by the New Orleans Pelicans)
Capital City Go-Go (by the Washington Wizards)
Cleveland Charge (by the Cleveland Cavaliers)
College Park Skyhawks (by the Atlanta Hawks)
Delaware Blue Coats (by the Philadelphia 76ers)
Fort Wayne Mad Ants (by the Indiana Pacers)
Greensboro Swarm (by the Charlotte Hornets)
Iowa Wolves (by the Minnesota Timberwolves)
Lakeland Magic (by the Orlando Magic)
Long Island Nets (by the Brooklyn Nets)
Maine Celtics (by the Boston Celtics)
Memphis Hustle (by the Memphis Grizzlies) 
Motor City Cruise (by the Detroit Pistons)
Oklahoma City Blue (by the Oklahoma City Thunder)
Ontario Clippers (by the Los Angeles Clippers)
Raptors 905 (by the Toronto Raptors)
Salt Lake City Stars (by the Utah Jazz)
Santa Cruz Warriors (by the Golden State Warriors)
Sioux Falls Skyforce (with the Miami Heat) 
South Bay Lakers (by the Los Angeles Lakers)
Stockton Kings (by the Sacramento Kings) 
Westchester Knicks (by the New York Knicks)
Windy City Bulls (by the Chicago Bulls)
Wisconsin Herd (by the Milwaukee Bucks)

Single affiliation/hybrid model: 
Grand Rapids Gold (with the Denver Nuggets)
Rio Grande Valley Vipers (with the Houston Rockets)
Texas Legends (with the Dallas Mavericks)

NBA teams without an exclusive affiliate: 
Phoenix Suns
Portland Trail Blazers

G League teams without an exclusive affiliate: 
Capitanes de Ciudad de México
NBA G League Ignite

Defunct / relocated teams

Team timeline
Tan = Current teams
Blue = Former teams or former names 
Green = Announced future teams

Player allocations 
NBA G League players generally do not sign contracts with the individual teams, but with the league itself. G League team rosters consist of a total of 12 players, 10 (or fewer) being G League players and two (or more) NBA players. The rosters are made up in a number of ways: the previous years' players, players taken in the G League draft, allocation players (meaning players who are assigned to a team with which they have a local connection, such as a University of Texas player being assigned to the Austin Spurs) and NBA team assignments. Each team also has local tryouts, and one player from the tryouts is assigned to the team.

The minimum age to play in the G League is 18, unlike the NBA which requires players to be 19 years old and one year out of high school in order to sign an NBA contract or be eligible for the draft. The base annual salary is US$35,000 plus housing and insurance benefits. Players who are called up for NBA get bonuses totalling up to US$50,000.

The tallest player ever to be assigned was Hasheem Thabeet at 7'3", the second player selected in the 2009 NBA draft. The tallest player to ever play in the G League was England's Paul Sturgess at 7'8", who played with the Texas Legends during the 2013–14 season.

Draft 

The NBA G League Draft occurs each season and is the major source from which teams build their rosters. Team rosters are made up of returning players (players who were on the team during the previous season), players waived by an NBA team who are designated as an affiliate player to their respective G League affiliate, allocated players (players who have local significance), and drafted players. The 8 round draft utilizes a serpentine format, meaning the order alternates in each round; Team A who selected first in Round 1 will select last in Round 2, while Team B who selected last in Round 1 will get the first pick in Round 2. Round 3 was added in 2014,

The league holds an annual Player Invitational, where prospects hope to earn eligibility for the upcoming draft.

Draft rights player rule
Since 2014–15, an NBA team that declines to sign an NBA draft pick can have them sign directly with their G League affiliate. Previously, an unsigned NBA pick could not be protected by the organization's G League affiliate, and the player might have ended up on the G League team of another organization.

Affiliate players
Players waived by an NBA team during training camp and up until the start of the regular season can be designated as affiliate players and allocated to the NBA team's G League affiliate. Each team is allowed four affiliate players. These are players that an NBA team is interested in developing in their own system. The affiliate players, however, still remain as free agents that any NBA team can sign.

Assignment

Standard assignment
Each NBA team can assign two first-year or second-year players who are under a standard NBA contract to its affiliated G League team. If more than two NBA players are assigned to a team, the team must reduce the number of G League players to keep the total roster size to 12. An NBA player will continue to be paid his NBA salary and will continue to be included on his NBA team's roster on the inactive list while playing in the G League.

NBA teams can call up players as many times as they choose, and there is no limit to the number of times an NBA player with three years or less experience can be assigned to the G League. Starting in 2011–12, veteran NBA players could be assigned with their consent. The first example of such was with Yi Jianlian, who the Dallas Mavericks assigned to the Texas Legends for two games.

Two-way contract
The 2017 Collective Bargaining Agreement for the NBA, which took effect with the 2017–18 season, included changes allowing each NBA team to sign two players on two-way contracts. Those players spend most of their time on the team's G League roster, but can freely move to their respective NBA team for up to 45 days in the regular season, as well as be a part of the team's roster before the start of the season (including NBA training camps) and after the conclusion of the G League's regular season (though they are not allowed to be on a team's playoff roster or play in a playoff game). Only players with four or less years of NBA experience are eligible for two-way contracts.

Unlike other G League players, who can be called up by any NBA team, two-way players can only be called up by their contracted NBA team. Players under two-way contracts are not counted against the NBA team's regular roster limit, and can be assigned to a G League affiliate for development while also getting a larger salary whenever they are called up to the parent team. For teams that do not have a one-to-one affiliation with a G League team, a process similar to the "flexible assignment" rule is being used to determine the placement for their own two-way contracts in the G League until every team has their proper affiliation underway.

In addition, salaries for two-way players are much higher than those for regular G League players. As of the 2017–18 season, G League players who are not on two-way contracts earn either $19,500 or $26,000 during the league's season. By contrast, two-way players' salaries while in the G League, which are pro-rated according to the number of days the player is with his G League team, are based on an annual salary between $50,000 and $75,000, and while these players are with their NBA team, they will earn a pro-rated portion of the NBA minimum rookie salary (which was $815,615 in the 2017–18 season).

Due to the COVID-19 pandemic, two-way players in 2020–21 were initially allowed to play up to 50 games in the NBA. Late in the season, restrictions were further lifted, allowing them to play more than 50 games as well as being eligible for the NBA playoffs.

Successful NBA call-ups 
Many former NBA draftees, waived players and undrafted players have played in the NBA D-League. Bobby Simmons, Aaron Brooks, and Pascal Siakam are the only former D-League players to win an NBA end-of-season award; all won the Most Improved Player Award with Simmons getting it with the Los Angeles Clippers in 2004–05, Brooks earning it with the Houston Rockets in 2009–10 and Siakam receiving it with the Toronto Raptors in the 2018-19 NBA season. Khris Middleton became the first former D-League player to be named an NBA All-Star when he was selected to participate in the 2019 All-Star Game.

In the 2008 NBA draft, the Idaho Stampede's Mike Taylor was drafted 55th by the Portland Trail Blazers. He became the first player from the NBA D-League to be drafted by an NBA team. He was subsequently traded and signed a rookie contract with the Los Angeles Clippers. In the 2014 draft, two D-League players were selected for the first time: P. J. Hairston was drafted 26th (which was also the first time a D–League player was drafted in the first round in the NBA) and Thanasis Antetokounmpo was the 51st pick.

Other noteworthy D-League call-ups include 2019 NBA Champion Jeremy Lin; Hassan Whiteside; 2011 NBA champion J. J. Barea; 2014, 2019 and 2020 NBA champion Danny Green; 2015, 2017 and 2018 NBA champion Shaun Livingston; and 2017 NBA champion Matt Barnes.

Annual events

All-Star Game 

The league held its first All-Star game February 17, 2007, at the Mandalay Bay Resort and Casino in Las Vegas, Nevada. It was part of the NBA All-Star Weekend in Las Vegas. As with the NBA's showcase game, a fan vote determined the starting lineup for each team. The East won, 114 to 100, with Pops Mensah-Bonsu named the game's MVP.

The second annual All-Star game was held on February 16, 2008, at the Ernest N. Morial Convention Center in New Orleans. The Blue team beat the Red team, 117–99, and Jeremy Richardson was named the MVP. In addition to the NBA D-League All-Star Game, the league debuted its first Dream Factory Friday Night events, which modeled after the NBA All-Star Saturday Night events. The events consists of Three-Point Shootout (won by Adam Harrington), Slam Dunk Contest (won by Brent Petway) and game of H-O-R-S-E (won by Lance Allred).

The 2009 D-League All-Star game was held on February 14, 2009, at the Phoenix Convention Center in Phoenix, Arizona. The Red Team defeated the Blue Team, 113–103, and Blake Ahearn and Courtney Sims were named co-MVPs. Along with the All-Star game, the NBA D-League ran their second annual Dream Factory Friday Night events. H-O-R-S-E was won by Will Conroy of the Albuquerque Thunderbirds. The Three-Point Shootout was won by Blake Ahearn of the Dakota Wizards, and the Slam Dunk Contest was won by James White of the Bakersfield Jam.

The 2010 D-League All-Star game was held on February 13, 2010, at the Dallas Convention Center in Dallas. The Western Conference team defeated the Eastern Conference Team, 98–81. Bakersfield Jam center Brian Butch, who scored 18 points and grabbed 13 rebounds, was named as the MVP of the game. The NBA D-League also ran their third annual Dream Factory Friday Night events. The inaugural Shooting Stars Competition was won by a team of Pat Carroll, Trey Gilder and Carlos Powell. The Three-Point Shootout was won by Andre Ingram of the Utah Flash, and the Slam Dunk Contest was won by Dar Tucker of the Los Angeles D-Fenders.

The game continued until 2017, with games continuing to be held during NBA All-Star Weekend at the same site. In 2018, it was replaced by a game between G League all-stars and the Mexico national team held in Los Angeles. After that, this contest did not return in any form. Since 2022, select G League players participate in the Rising Stars Challenge alongside NBA rookie and sophomore players.

NBA G League Showcase 
The league stages an annual NBA G League Showcase in which all of the league's teams play each other in a "carnival" format. The showcase was first played in 2005 was originally intended solely as a scouting event for NBA general managers and scouts, but evolved into a four-day event in which each team plays two games apiece. From 2005 to 2017, 15 players were called-up or recalled during or immediately following the Showcase.

As of 2019, the event's location was the Mandalay Bay Resort and Casino on the Las Vegas Strip. Because of limited space at the conference center site, all games are played without spectators, although TV and Internet coverage is available for all games. The 2019 showcase was a series of mini-tournaments in which the winning team shared a $100,000 grand prize.

Before Las Vegas, host cities were Columbus, Georgia (2005), Fayetteville, North Carolina (2006), Sioux Falls, South Dakota (2007), Boise, Idaho (2008), Orem, Utah (2009), Boise, Idaho (2010), South Padre Island, Texas (2011), Reno, Nevada in 2012 and 2013, Santa Cruz, California in 2015, and Mississauga, Ontario in 2017 and 2018. It was not held in 2016.

NBA G League International Challenge

Honors

List of champions

Awards 

Most Valuable Player
Finals MVP
All-Star Game MVP
Defensive Player of the Year
Impact Player of the Year
Most Improved Player
Rookie of the Year
Coach of the Year
Sportsmanship Award
Team Executive of the Year
Basketball Executive of the Year
All-G League Team
All-Defensive Team
All-Rookie Team
Development Champion

See also 
 List of developmental and minor sports leagues
 List of NBA G League yearly standings
 List of NBA G League champions

References

External links 

 
 D-League – Basketball-Reference.com

 
Basketball leagues in Canada
Basketball leagues in Mexico
Basketball leagues in the United States
Sports leagues established in 2001
2001 establishments in the United States
Professional sports leagues in the United States
Professional sports leagues in Canada
Professional sports leagues in Mexico
Multi-national professional sports leagues